Europa | Fira is a railway and metro station on the Llobregat–Anoia Line. It is located underneath Gran Via de les Corts Catalanes, near Plaça d'Europa and Carrer d'Amadeu Torner, in the L'Hospitalet de Llobregat municipality, to the south-west of Barcelona, in Catalonia, Spain. The station can be accessed from both sidewalks of Gran Via, serving as a major public transport access to the Gran Via business center. It is served by Line 8, Line 9, Baix Llobregat Metro lines S33, S4 and S8, and commuter rail lines R5, R6, R50 and R60.

Barcelona Metro line 9 (designated L9 Sud) started services at the station on 12 February 2016, when the line's , 15-station portion between Barcelona–El Prat Airport and Zona Universitària station in western Barcelona opens for passenger service.

See also
 Fira de Barcelona
 Gran Via (Barcelona)
 Granvia l'Hospitalet
 Transport in L'Hospitalet de Llobregat

References

External links
 Information on the L9 Sud at the Transports Metropolitans de Barcelona website
 Information and photos of the Llobregat–Anoia Line station at trenscat.cat 
 Video on train operations at the Llobregat–Anoia Line station on YouTube

Stations on the Llobregat–Anoia Line
Barcelona Metro line 8 stations
Barcelona Metro line 9 stations
Railway stations in L'Hospitalet de Llobregat
Railway stations in Spain opened in 2007
Railway stations located underground in Spain